Immersaria is a genus of lichenized fungi within the Lecideaceae family.

References

External links
Immersaria at Index Fungorum

Lecideales genera
Lichen genera
Lecideales